Tanmay Bhat (born 23 June 1987) is an Indian YouTuber, comedian, scriptwriter, Actor, performer and producer. He was the co-founder and former CEO of the creative agency All India Bakchod (AIB) along with Gursimranjet Singh Khamba. In 2018, he was a judge on Season 1 of Comicstaan, a stand-up comedy competition broadcast on Amazon Prime.

In mid-2019 he started the YouTube channel "Tanmay Bhat", where he posts vlogs, comedy sketches, reaction videos and video essays and streams games such as PUBG Mobile,Among Us etc.

Tanmay Bhat is recently in controversy due to his insulting and blasphemous tweets about Lord Ganesha and has been dropped off by Kotak Mahindra's campaign due to this. He has  also joked on child rape, and passed misogynistic comments before.

He has performed at many stand-up comedy shows and was also part of 'Weirdass Comedy' founded by comedian Vir Das.

Career

Film and television 
Tanmay Bhat had his debut with UTV Bindass' flagship show, Hass Ley India. He wrote for MTV India's Wassup and Nachle Ve with Saroj Khan. He ventured into story, screenplay and dialogue writing for Disney India's daily comedies Kya Mast Hai Life and NDTV Imagine's Oye! It's Friday! with Farhan Akhtar.

He was the writer and producer for India's More Talent, a subsidiary comedy show spawning from Not true, and has scripted TV award shows, including the Filmfare Awards, Star Parivaar Awards, Balaji Awards, Big TV Awards and Stardust Awards.

He had a brief cameo appearance in Ragini MMS and appeared in Mr. X.

All India Bakchod

All India Bakchod was co-founded as a YouTube channel in 2013 by Tanmay Bhat, Gursimran Khamba, Rohan Joshi and Ashish Shakya. They filmed sketches, performed stand-up comedy, and co-wrote shows as a comedy company. By early 2015, the comedy group became a creative agency, making branded content for corporate clients. AIB's first foray into YouTube consisted of short spoofs and mimicry-based sketches. Song parodies continued to feature stereotypical situations and play on heavy nostalgia in their work. They popularized a satirical trope, "Honest Indian...", which they applied to various situations. Their podcast guests and work collaborators included Bollywood celebrities, global and Indian comedians and filmmakers.

In May 2016 Bhat uploaded a Snapchat video mimicking Sachin Tendulkar and Lata Mangeshkar, arguing about who is a better player. The video generated heated controversy over their portrayal, which some deemed offensive and appalling, while others found it hilarious and witty. Following this, an FIR was registered by the Maharashtra Navnirman Sena against him and Mumbai police wrote to Google and YouTube requesting the video be deleted.

In 2017 the comedian was booked and an FIR was filed against him for posting a meme of Indian Prime Minister Narendra Modi on Snapchat.

Me Too controversy

In October 2018, writer and comedian Mahima Kukreja accused the YouTuber Utsav Chakraborty, who worked as a freelancer with All India Bakchod, of sending her and other women lewd messages and photos via social messaging apps. At the time, Bhat was the CEO of AIB. Several comedians within Chakraborty's circle, including Tanmay Bhat, knew about the allegations of harassment but opted to keep quiet and work with him. On 8 October 2018, AIB announced that Bhat would immediately "be stepping away from his association with AIB" for the time being. Amazon Video removed Bhat from the panel of judges for the second season of Comicstaan due to the allegations.

In May 2019, AIB announced that Bhat was no longer suspended but removed from the CEO post. A few weeks later, Bhat stated in videos posted to Instagram that he suffered from clinical depression, drawing criticism from Mahima Kukreja and fellow comedian Aditi Mittal, both of whom accused Bhat of using depression as a good and characterised his claims as insincere.

YouTube 
Bhat returned to YouTube in November 2019, streaming PUBG: Battlegrounds. He also launched a second channel, 'Honestly by Tanmay Bhat', where he hosts 'learning streams' and videos featuring experts in various topics.

Bhat teamed up with YouTuber Saiman Says in January 2020 and brought in several comedians, including Sorabh Pant, Ajey Nagar, Kaneez Surka and Zakir Khan, for the "TreeMathon 2020" live stream. The stream was an 8-hour live session with people playing the game Getting Over It to support Mission Green Mumbai and raise funds to plant as many trees as possible in response to the deforestation drive at Aarey Milk Colony.

In early April 2020, Bhat and Kaneez Surka hosted an 8-hour live stream for two days, raising over Rs 1.7 million for charities fighting the COVID-19 pandemic. Bhat moderated multiplayer online games with fellow comedians Rohan Joshi, Kaneez Surka, Bhuvan Bam, Anuvab Pal, Varun Grover and Kusha Kapila.

In 2020, Netflix India started a series with Bhat reacting to various movies & TV shows on Netflix, called "Tanmay Reacts". Tanmay also reacts on the memes and videos on his own channel.

Advertising
In 2020-2021 Bhat co-wrote the scripts of several advertisements for the financial services company Cred, which featured actors and other celebrities including Shah Rukh Khan, Madhuri Dixit, Bappi Lahiri, Ravi Shastri, Anil Kapoor, Rahul Dravid, Kapil Dev and Neeraj Chopra.

Filmography

References

External links
 

Indian stand-up comedians
Living people
1987 births
Indian YouTubers
Artists from Mumbai
Indian male screenwriters
Comedy YouTubers
Gaming YouTubers
YouTube vloggers
Indian producers
Indian male comedians
21st-century Indian screenwriters
YouTube channels launched in 2006